Goran Maričić (born 21 August 1988) is a Serbian football forward who plays for Sloga Požega in Serbian League West.

References

External links
 
 

1988 births
Living people
People from Ivanjica
Association football forwards
Serbian footballers
FK Javor Ivanjica players
FK Radnički Šid players
Serbian SuperLiga players